Loko le is the thirteenth studio album by the Belgian-Dutch girlgroup K3. The album was released on 22 November 2013 through label Studio 100. Three singles were released to promote the album: "Koning Willem-Alexander" (a remake of their 2012 single "Willem-Alexander"), "Eya hoya!" and "Loko le". Loko le reached the top five in both the Flemish and Dutch album charts.

Track list

Chart performance

Weekly charts

Year-end charts

Certifications

References

2013 albums
K3 (band) albums